Rutherford High School is a public high school in Panama City, Florida, United States.

The school, which describes itself as the "Home of the Rams" and is a part of the Bay District Schools, opened in 1961 as the second high school in Bay County. The school held its first graduation ceremony in 1964. The school was accredited by the SACS in 1963. In 2006, Rutherford had a student population of 1,755 students. Rutherford currently draw’s its students from the eastern side of Bay County with the majority being the Callaway, Cedar Grove, Springfield, Parker and Tyndall Air Force Base areas respectively.

Overview
Rutherford High School offers several different tracks to its students. Rutherford is host to a chapter of the International Baccalaureate program, Air Force Junior Reserve Officer Training Corps (JROTC), and the Communications and Technology Academy (Com/Tech). In addition, Advanced Placement, dual-enrolled, and honors level courses are available for all students.  Extracurricular activities include sports, service clubs, and many other student organizations.  Rutherford offers more themed academies than any of the other schools in Bay County.

Grades
Rutherford High School has consistently been ranked a "B"  or "C" grade school under Florida's A++ Plan, the school's 2006–2007 score was "D".  The school's current theme is "Whatever it takes!" with the aim of being ranked an "A" school and raising the achievement levels of all students in accordance with the No Child Left Behind Act.

Reviews and ratings 
Rutherford High School has received some negative reviews; e.g. GreatSchools.org gave Rutherford a 4/10 rating, with mixed community reviews.

Hurricane Michael
As most schools in Panama City, Florida were damaged by Category 5 Hurricane Michael in October 2018, Rutherford High School was used as an emergency shelter during the aftermath. The shelter residents experienced dissatisfaction with the school's role as a shelter. Others recalled its unsanitary conditions such as toilets being clogged with feces, poor quality foods, and the shelter lacking skilled doctors with licenses. After the storm it was announced that Rutherford would temporarily integrate as a 6-12 school for the remainder of the 2018–19 school year and for the 2019–20 school year after the neighboring Everitt Middle School had extensive damage. As of 2021 it is still operating as a 6-12 school as there are had been no plans to rebuild Everitt Middle School.

Educational programs

International Baccalaureate
International Baccalaureate (IB) began its authorization on campus in 1992.  Rutherford High School's IB Program serves as a Magnet Program for the Bay County School District. Cathy Rutland serves as the program's coordinator for the 2015–2016 school year.

IB classes (11th and 12th grade) are offered in six concurrent academic areas: Language A1: (First Language) including the study of selections from World Literature, Language B: (Second Language) or second Language A, Individuals and Societies (Social Sciences), Experimental Sciences, Mathematics, and The Arts and Electives.  Pre-IB courses are also offered in all subject areas for 9th and 10th grades.

Communications Technology
Also known as ComTech, Rutherford's Communications Technology course consists of classes that teach students how to use many computer programs such as Photoshop, Dreamweaver, Flash and Adobe Premier. In addition to these program based courses, Comtech also has some core classes such as English and History. These classes however take a different approach to teaching the students. The ComTech curriculum is built around technology, thus many, if not all, of the classwork and lessons are built around programs such as Microsoft's Powerpoint, Excel, and Word.

Student life

Student organizations

 AFJROTC (Including Color Guard)
 Anchor Club
 Aries (Yearbook)
 A.S.S.E.
 Avatar Club
 Band
 National Beta Club
 Cheerleading
 Choir
 ComTech (Communications Technology)

 Diamond Girls
 FCA (Fellowship of Christian Athletes)
 FEA
 Golden Girls
 IBSC (International Baccalaureate Student Council)
 Ignite Club
 Interact Club
 International Thespian Society
 I.S.L.A.M. Club
 Mu Alpha Theta (Mathematics Honor Society)

 National Honor Society
 Pep Club
 Rampage (School Virtual Newspaper)
 RSGA (Rutherford Student Government Association)
 RVEC 
 Science Club
 Secular Student Alliance
 Spanish Club
 Sign Language Club
 WRAM (School News & TV)

Sports 

 Baseball
 Basketball (girls and boys)
 Cheerleading
 Cross country
 Football
 Golden Girls
 Golf (girls and boys)
 Soccer (girls and boys; boys were 2017 district champs)

 Softball
 Tennis (girls and boys)
 Track (girls and boys)
 Volleyball
 Weightlifting (girls and boys)
 Wrestling

References

External links
 Rutherford Home Page
 Rutherford Alumni site

Buildings and structures in Panama City, Florida
Educational institutions established in 1961
High schools in Bay County, Florida
Public high schools in Florida
1961 establishments in Florida